Robert E. Caselli (born December 3, 1927) is an American politician. He served as a Democratic member of the South Dakota House of Representatives.

Life and career 
Caselli attended Proviso Township High School, Dakota State University, the University of South Dakota and the University of Chicago.

Caselli was principal of Washington High School.

In 1991, Caselli was elected to the South Dakota House of Representatives, serving until 1994.

References 

1927 births
Living people
Democratic Party members of the South Dakota House of Representatives
20th-century American politicians
American school principals
Dakota State University alumni
University of South Dakota alumni
University of Chicago alumni